No. 25 Squadron is a unit of the Indian Air Force assigned to South Western Air Command. The Squadron participates in operations involving air, land and airdrop of troops, equipment, supplies, and support or augment special operations forces, when appropriate.

History
The No. 25 Squadron were raised in 1963 at Chandigarh and moved to the present location. 
25 Squadron also played a vital role in the Indo-Pak conflicts of 1965 and 1971, Operation Parakram, Operation Vijay and Kargil Operation in 1999.

Lineage
 Constituted as No. 25 Squadron (Himalayan Eagles) on 1 March 1963

Assignments
 Indo-Pakistani War of 1965
 Indo-Pakistani War of 1971

Aircraft
 An-12
 AN-32
 IL-76

References

025